The 2014–15 FK-League was the sixth season of the FK-League.

Men

Teams
 Busan Kappa FC 
 Chungbuk Jecheon FS 
 Daejeon IFC
 Dream Hub Gunsan FS
 Fantasia Bucheon FS
 FITF
 Jeonju MAG FC
 FS Seoul
 Seoul Eunpyeong FS
 Seoul Gwangjin FC
 Yes Gumi FS
 Yongin FS

Women

Teams
 Busan Kappa WFC
 Daejeon Blue-i
 FS Hornets
 Jeonbuk Gimje Philos WFC
 FS Seoul Ladies

League table

Championship Match

Champions

FK-League
2014 in futsal
2015 in futsal